The 2019 World Financial Group Continental Cup was held from January 17 to 20 at the Orleans Arena in Paradise, Nevada. This was the fourth time the event is being held in Paradise and the fourth time outside Canada. The event featured new team scramble competitions, with players from different traditional teams competing together, along with the mixed doubles, team, and skins competitions seen in previous years.

Team World was in the lead for the entirety of the event. However, a strong performance from Team North America in the final skins draw, holding Team World to 0.5 points in the first seven ends of all three matches, led to the winner being decided in the eighth and final end. The cup was decided in the women's game when Eve Muirhead made a hit and stick to win a skin worth 2.5 points against Team Rachel Homan to clinch the title.

The final result was a 34–26 victory for Team World, their first win since 2012. Team World collected CAD$85,000; Team North America collected CAD$45,000.

Competition format

This edition of the Continental Cup will use a new format. There will be sixty points available, distributed as follows:

The number of traditional team games is reduced under this format, with each team now playing in only one traditional team game instead of three as in past years.  There is one additional mixed doubles draw, eliminating the practice of having the third mixed doubles game consisting of two pairs of players who switch after four ends of play; this in turn ensures that all players are involved in one full mixed doubles game.

The two new events are the team scramble and mixed team scramble. The team scramble will be a mix of the traditional teams into same-gender lineups. Front-end or back-end teammates cannot stay together, but a back-end player may play with a front-end teammate. The mixed teams scramble will use mixed teams, with at least one team per side skipped by a female. There is one men's team scramble draw and one women's team scramble draw, with each game worth one point; each game in the single mixed scramble draw is worth two points.

Teams

Events
All draw times are listed in Pacific Daylight Time (UTC−7:00).

Thursday, January 17

Draw 1
Mixed doubles
8:30 am

Draw 2
Mixed doubles
1:30 pm

Draw 3
Women's team play
6:30 pm

Friday, January 18

Draw 4
Mixed doubles
8:30 am

Draw 5
Mixed doubles
1:30 pm

Draw 6
Men's team play
6:30 pm

Saturday, January 19

Draw 7
Women's team scramble
8:30 am

Draw 8
Men's team scramble
1:30 pm

Draw 9
Mixed team scramble
6:30 pm

Sunday, January 20

Draw 10
Skins
11:00 am

Draw 11
Skins
4:00 pm

References

External links 

Media Guide (web archive)

2018
2019 in curling
2019 in sports in Nevada
Sports competitions in the Las Vegas Valley
21st century in Las Vegas
January 2019 sports events in the United States
2019